Facundo Agustín Ponzio (born 14 November 1995) is an Argentinian footballer who plays for CF Badalona in Spain, on loan from Instituto, as a forward.

Club career
Born in Córdoba, Ponzio graduated from hometown Instituto's youth setup. He played his first match as a professional on 28 May 2013, aged 17, in a 2-0 home loss against Gimnasia La Plata in the Primera B Nacional.

On 2 June Ponzio was handed his first start, and scored his side's first in a 2–3 away defeat against CA Patronato. He renewed his link with Instituto (which sold 20% of his rights to a business company) on 26 July 2013, signing until 2016.

However, Ponzio was rarely played during the 2013–14 campaign, and subsequently was loaned to Spanish Segunda División B side CF Badalona on 5 September 2014.

References

External links
ESPN Deportes profile 

1988 births
Living people
Footballers from Córdoba, Argentina
Argentine footballers
Association football forwards
Primera Nacional players
Instituto footballers
CF Badalona players
Argentine expatriate footballers
Argentine expatriate sportspeople in Spain
Expatriate footballers in Spain